Senator Hewitt may refer to:

Charles J. Hewitt (1867–1940), New York State Senate
Goldsmith W. Hewitt (1834–1895), Alabama State Senate
Leslie R. Hewitt (1867–1936), California State Senate
Mike Hewitt (politician) (born 1946), Washington State Senate
Sharon Hewitt (born 1958), Louisiana State Senate